Terminalia latifolia is a species of plant in the Combretaceae family. It is found in Guatemala and Jamaica.

References

latifolia
Near threatened plants
Taxonomy articles created by Polbot
Taxa named by Olof Swartz